Jana Heczková-Madajová, née Heczková (born May 4, 1967), of the SK Žiarska dolina is a Slovak ski mountaineer and fell runner.

Selected results

Ski mountaineering 
 1998:
 2nd, Patrouille des Glaciers (together with Claudine Trécourt and Alexia Zuberer)
 2000:
 2nd, Psotkov memoriál
 2nd, Tatranská magistrála
 2001:
 5th, European Championship team race (together with Miroslava Paliderová)
 2002:
 6th, World Championship team race (together with Miroslava Paliderová)
 6th, European Championship single race
 9th, European Championship combination ranking

Pierra Menta 

 1995: 1st, together with Tatiana Moskova
 1996: 1st, together with Tatiana Moskova
 1997: 3rd, together with Isabel Rogé Tartarini
 1998: 3rd, together with Corinne Favre

Sky running 
 2000:
 1st Sentiero 4 Luglio SkyMarathon half marathon

References 

1967 births
Living people
Slovak female ski mountaineers
Slovak female long-distance runners
Slovak mountain runners